Qeysar, Qaysar, or Qaisar, Arabic and Persian for "Caesar", may refer to:
Qeysar (film), an Iranian film
Qaysar District, Faryab Province, Afghanistan
Qeysar, Qaen, a village in Qaen County, South Khorasan Province, Iran
Azhar Shah Qaiser (1920-1985), Indian Islamic scholar
Qaiser Khan (born 1971), Indian politician

See also 

 Qaisar
 Kaisar (disambiguation)
 Kaiser (disambiguation)
 Caesar (disambiguation)